The 2012 Chinese Figure Skating Championships were held between September 20 and September 23, 2011 in Changchun. Skaters competed in the disciplines of men's singles, ladies' singles, pair skating, and ice dancing.

Results

Men

Ladies

Pairs

Ice dancing

External links
 info
 results

Chinese Figure Skating Championships
2011 in figure skating
Chinese Figure Skating Championships, 2012